David Gere (born February 15, 1975) is an American film producer, actor, artist and business entrepreneur.

Biography 
David Gere was born and raised in Cromwell, Connecticut, and attended Cromwell High School. He later attended Providence College in Providence, Rhode Island on an academic and track scholarship. Gere was signed to a modelling contract in NYC, but soon transitioned into acting.

In business, David later got heavily involved with commercial real estate and development in Connecticut. He created several small business ventures before heading back into the entertainment industry as a film producer and actor; he directed his first film in 2021. Gere also owns several bars, nightclubs and restaurants that have been used for filming locations, celebrity appearances and charitable events. Gere was awarded “Top 40 Under 40” by CT Magazine in January 2014, a list of young entrepreneurs and successful business persons.
 
Gere is known for casting professional wrestlers in his films.  This relationship led to legendary professional wrestler Tommy Dreamer suggesting that Gere get involved with sports entertainment; at Tommy Dreamer's House of Hardcore 3, Gere debuted as his pro wrestling heel manager persona of DG HAVEN. He is currently active in both the House of Hardcore and the Revival Pro Wrestling promotions.

Career 
Gere is best known for his role as Frank Meltzer on the CW Network’s hit show Gossip Girl. Gere has also appeared in many television shows and movies, including Ugly Betty, Rocky Balboa, Remains, The Dark Knight Rises, Infected, Self Storage, Army of the Damned, and A Bet's A Bet. In 2014, Gere co-starred in the thriller, Buddy Hutchins with Jamie Kennedy, Sally Kirkland, and Sara Malakul Lane. The story of the film was highlighted in an Entertainment Tonight piece that aired on February 22, 2014, as the film was produced by the youngest movie producer in history, Richard Switzer, who is Gere's producing partner at Switzer Entertainment Group, LLC. In the summer of 2014, Gere was cast as Tyler Lavey in the teen sex caper, School's Out.  The character was loosely based on Gere's real life, as he portrayed a nightclub owner who mentors two high school misfits. Gere is a producing partner at the Woodhaven Production company and has produced various feature films including Sensory Perception, Self Storage, Chilling Visions: The 5 Senses of Fear, Army of the Damned, A Bet's a Bet, The Devil's Dozen, and Almost Mercy.

Gere formed a unique relationship with the infamous former mobster, Henry Hill after Hill appeared twice at The Shadow Room. Gere became close to Hill, and they were developing a project together in which Gere was to portray Hill. Hill was famously portrayed by Ray Liotta in the award-winning box office hit, Goodfellas, which was directed by Martin Scorsese. Hill died unexpectedly just days after a meeting with Gere. The future of the film is unknown at this time, but Gere has indicated that he has been in contact with Hill's girlfriend, Lisa Caserta, to revive the project.

References

External links 

1975 births
Living people
People from Cromwell, Connecticut